Lee Elias (May 21, 1920 – April 8, 1998) was a British-American comics artist. He was best known for his work on the Black Cat comic book published by Harvey Comics in the 1940s.

Biography
Emigrating to the United States from Manchester, England, when he was a boy, Elias studied art at the Cooper Union and the Art Students League of New York. He started working in comics in 1943 at Fiction House, where his work included features such as "Captain Wings" in Wing Comics, on which he succeeded Bob Lubbers, as well as the Western hero Firehair. 

After leaving Fiction House in 1946, he worked for several different comics companies, including Timely Comics, Hillman Periodicals, and National/DC where he worked on such characters as the Flash, Tommy Tomorrow, and Black Canary. He drew three issues of All Star Comics in 1947 and co-created the Fiddler and the original Star Sapphire with writer Robert Kanigher in All-Flash #32 (Dec. 1947).

Black Cat
It was Elias's work on Black Cat, a stuntwoman turned crimefighter, for Harvey Comics, that stood out in this period. The series was praised by comics historian Trina Robbins for its "logical" and "straightforward" approach, in contrast to more fantasy-oriented titles like Wonder Woman. Elias worked both as a penciler and an inker in this series, with an art style largely influenced by artists such as Milton Caniff and Noel Sickles. Elias worked for a period as Caniff's assistant. He used the same style for the comic book version of Terry and the Pirates, Caniff's classic comic strip in the same period. Lee Elias left comic books after the 1954 publication of Fredric Wertham's anti-comics book Seduction of the Innocent, which used four of his Black Cat panels as examples of "depraved" comic art.

Beyond Mars
Elias' work on comic strips included a two-year stint as an assistant to Al Capp on Li'l Abner. His best known comic strip was Beyond Mars, which ran from 1952 to 1955 and was co-created by Elias and science fiction writer Jack Williamson. The strip was exclusive to the New York Daily News''' Sunday paper in the United States but was syndicated in Europe and Australia. It was the last Sunday strip to be color-engraved by hand, according to comic strip historian Rick Marschall.

Later career
Elias drew the "Green Arrow" backup feature in Adventure Comics and World's Finest Comics from 1959 to 1964. He and writer Bob Haney co-created the supervillain Eclipso in House of Secrets #61 (August 1963).McAvennie, Michael "1960s" in Dolan, p. 109: "In August's House of Secrets #61, writer Bob Haney and artist Lee Elias used a black diamond to transform Dr. Bruce Gordon into Eclipso." Elias only drew the first two appearances of the character and was succeeded on the feature by Alex Toth. His other work for DC in the 1960s included Cave Carson and Adam Strange. From the mid-1960s to the early 1970s, Elias returned to his native England. In 1972, Elias came back to American comic books, working mainly on DC's various horror titles and secondary Marvel Comics titles including Power Man and The Human Fly. His last major project was The Rook series for Warren Publishing, a black-and-white time travel series which played to his strengths as a Western and science fiction artist. With the cancellation of The Rook in 1982, Elias retired from comics, though he continued teaching at the School of Visual Arts and The Kubert School.

Bibliography
DC Comics

 Adventure Comics #257–269 (Green Arrow); #439 (Seven Soldiers of Victory) (1959–1975) 
 All-Flash #29–32 (1947) 
 All-Out War #2 (1979) 
 All Star Comics #34–36 (Justice Society of America) (1947) 
 Batman Family #15 (Batgirl and Robin) (1977) 
 Blitzkrieg #5 (1976) 
 Challengers of the Unknown #72 (1970) 
 Comic Cavalcade #29 (1948) 
 Danger Trail #1 (1950) 
 DC Special #23–25 (The Three Musketeers) (1976) 
 DC Special Series #13 (1978) 
 DC Super Stars #15 (1977) 
 Detective Comics #156–157, 163–166 (Robotman) (1950) 
 Falling in Love #113, 116, 119–120 (1970–1971) 
 Flash Comics #86, 91–93, 97–99 (1947–1948) 
 Ghosts #24, 30, 42–44, 46, 49–50, 69–70 (1974–1978) 
 Girls' Romances #153, 156 (1970–1971) 
 Heart Throbs #125 (1970) 
 House of Mystery #86, 95–96, 102, 104–106, 113, 117, 123, 146, 153, 286 (1959–1980) 
 House of Secrets #22, 33, 36, 44, 56, 58, 61–62 (1959–1963) 
 My Greatest Adventure #27, 29, 34–35, 42, 44, 47, 51, 54, 59, 61, 73, 78 (1959–1963) 
 Mystery in Space #92–100, 102 (Adam Strange); #101; #103–110 (Ultra the Multi-Alien) (1964–1966) 
 Our Army at War #296, 300 (1976–1977) 
 Secret Hearts #151 (1971) 
 Secrets of Haunted House #16 (1979) 
 Sgt. Rock #303, 308–310 (1977) 
 Showcase #41–42, 44, 46–47 (Tommy Tomorrow); #48–49, 52 (Cave Carson) (1962–1964) 
 Strange Adventures #168, 170–171, 176, 178, 193–196, 199, 202–203, 212 (1964–1968) 
 Tales of the Unexpected #36, 42, 49, 69–70, 72, 89, 91, 102 (1959–1967) 
 Teen Titans #15 (1968) 
 The Unexpected #105, 136, 140–142, 148, 158, 160–161, 169, 178, 181, 199 (1968–1980) 
 The Witching Hour #19, 35–36, 46, 52, 70 (1972–1977) 
 World's Finest Comics #100–134, 136, 138, 140 (Green Arrow); #237 (Superman/Batman team-up) (1959–1976) 
 Young Romance #165 (1970)

Harvey Comics
 Black Cat #2–30, 33, 38–39, 43–44, 46–51, 54–56, 63–65 (1946–1963)

Marvel Comics

 Captain America #257 (1981) 
 Daredevil #144 (1977) 
 Epic Illustrated #23 (1984) 
 Human Fly #1, 3–4, 7, 10–12, 15, 18–19 (1977–1979) 
 Invaders Annual #1 (1977) 
 Marvel Preview #15, 18 (1978–1979) 
 Omega the Unknown #8 (1977) 
 Power Man #40–46, Annual #1 (1976–1977) 
 Power Man and Iron Fist #54–55 (1978–1979)
 The Spectacular Spider-Man #35 (1979) 
 Sub-Mariner Comics #22 (1947)

Warren Publishing
 Eerie #102–103 (1979)  
 The Goblin #1–3 (1982) 
 The Rook Magazine #1–6, 8–14 (1979–1982)

References

External links
 
 Lee Elias at Mike's Amazing World of Comics
 Lee Elias at the Unofficial Handbook of Marvel Comics Creators

Further reading
Lee Elias obituary, The Comics Journal'' #204 (May 1998)

1920 births
1998 deaths
20th-century American artists
American comics artists
American comic strip cartoonists
American art educators
Artists from Manchester
Art Students League of New York alumni
Cooper Union alumni
DC Comics people
British emigrants to the United States
Golden Age comics creators
Marvel Comics people
School of Visual Arts faculty
Silver Age comics creators